ART Ii Biennale of Northern Environmental and Sculpture Art produces ecologically sustainable artworks to the cultural tradition areas of Ii, Finland. The biennale is organized by the Art Centre KulttuuriKauppila. The art works of ART Ii Biennale are created in ten days with the assistance of the inhabitants of the small town of Ii, located on the northern coast of Finland. The art works of the Biennale 2008 and 2010 are situated by a riverside path connecting the 700-year-old harbour area of Hamina and KulttuuriKauppila Art Centre. ART Ii Seminar gathers together professional artists, curators, representatives and officers of art and culture organizations and institutions as well as politics to consider and develop together current issues in the field of northern environmental and sculpture art. Curator and researcher Otso Kantokorpi led the seminar in 2010.

Artists - Biennale 2008 
 Alfio Bonanno, Denmark
 Vladimir Zorin, Russia
 Jenni Tieaho, Finland
 Eyglò Hardardòttir, Iceland

Artists - Biennale 2010 
 Lars Vilks, Sweden
 Helena Kaikkonen, Finland
 Egil Martin Kurdøl, Norway
 Maria Panínguak` Kjærulff, Greenland
 Linus Ersson, Sweden
 Maruyama Yoshiko, Japan

References 
 ART Ii Biennale
 Art Centre KulttuuriKauppila, ART Ii Biennale catalogue Retrieved 2011-08-04.

Art festivals in Finland
Art biennials